Pascal Cherki (born 1 September 1966) is a French politician. A member of the 1 July Movement, he served as a member of the National Assembly between 2012 and 2017 and the mayor of the 14th arrondissement of Paris (2009-2014).

References

1966 births
Living people
Politicians from Paris
Socialist Party (France) politicians
Deputies of the 14th National Assembly of the French Fifth Republic
Councillors of Paris
Mayors of arrondissements of Paris
21st-century French lawyers